Spinners Live! is a 1975 live album from American soul act The Spinners. The release was a modest commercial success and has received positive critical assessment.

Reception
The editors of AllMusic Guide scored Spinners Live! four out of five stars, with reviewer Andrew Hamilton particularly praising the compact disc re-release for its sound quality, summing up his review that this release is "a good, if not great, live album where the highs make up for the lows".

Track listing
"Fascinating Rhythm" (George Gershwin and Ira Gershwin) – 2:34
"I've Got to Make It on My Own" (Bruce Hawes and Charles Simmons) – 4:04
"Living a Little, Laughing a Little" (Thom Bell and Linda Creed – 4:38
"One of a Kind (Love Affair)" (Joseph Jefferson) – 3:36
"Then Came You" (Sherman Marshall and Phillip T. Pugh) – 4:01
"Sadie" (Hawes, Jefferson, and Simmons) – 7:33
"How Could I Let You Get Away" (Yvette Davis) – 7:06
"Could It Be I'm Falling in Love" (Melvin Steals and Mervin Steals) – 4:26
Superstar Medley – 11:31
"It's Not Unusual" (Gordon Mills and Les Reed)
"Don't Mess with Bill" (Smokey Robinson)
"Paper Doll" (Johnny Black)
"Stop! In the Name of Love" (Holland–Dozier–Holland)
"If I Didn't Care" (Jack Lawrence
"Hound Dog" (Jerry Leiber and Mike Stoller)
"Hello Dolly" (Jerry Herman)
"Love Don't Love Nobody" (Part 1) (Jefferson and Simmons) – 4:51
"Love Don't Love Nobody" (Part 2) (Jefferson and Simmons) – 4:48
"Mighty Love" (Hawes, Jefferson, and Simmons) – 8:02

Note: songs 10 and 11 are a single track on the compact disc release.

Personnel

The Spinners
Henry Fambrough
Billy Henderson
Pervis Jackson
Bobby Smith
Philippé Wynne
Additional musicians (see MFSB)
Linda Creed – vocals on "Then Came You"
Bill Neale – guitar
Ted Smith – drums
Rodney Vorhis – bass guitar
Rodney Stepp – piano, organ
Larry Washington – congas, percussion
Tommy Williams – guitar
Technical personnel
Thom Bell – production
Ken Duncan – mastering at Kendun Recorders
Jim Gaines – mixing engineering
Jim "Reds" Gallagher – recording engineering
John Golden – mastering on CD re-release
Maurice King – arrangement, conducting
Win Koots – mixing engineering
Don Murray – recording engineering
Eric Porter – photography
Mark "Bear" Porter – liner notes
PorterWagnerDesign – design on CD re-release
William Rawley – photography
Joe Tarsia – recording engineering
Ilene Wagner – photography
Wayne Wilfong – engineering

Sales and chart performance
Domestically, Spinners Live! reached 20 on the Billboard 200 and fourth place on the R&B charts. In Canada, it topped out at 72, according to RPM. The album was certified gold by March 1976. Billboard ranked this album the 35th best-selling soul album of 1976.

See also
List of 1975 albums

References

External links

1975 live albums
Albums produced by Thom Bell
Atlantic Records live albums
The Spinners (American group) live albums